Hichem Guemmadi (born April 16, 1976) is an Algerian international volleyball player.

Representing with his home team at the 1998 World Championship, his team finished in 19th place.

He participated in the 2006 and 2008 Arab Nations Championship with the Algeria men's national volleyball team.

With the professional Club Tours Volley-Ball, he won the 2004–05 CEV Champions League. At the 2006–07 CEV Champions League season, his team finished as runner-up, losing the final game to German team VfB Friedrichshafen. He also took home the Best Scorer award.

Clubs

  NC Béjaïa  (1994–1996)
  Annaba HVB  1996-1999)
  Chaumont Volley-Ball 52  (1999–2000)
  AS Cannes  (2000–2002)
  Tours Volley-Ball (2002–2007)
  Al-Nasr Dubaï (2007–2009)

Awards

Individuals
 2009 Asian Men's Club Championship "Most Valuable Player"
 2008 Asian Men's Club Championship "Best Scorer"
 2006–07 CEV Champions League "Best Scorer"

Clubs
 2003 France Cup -  Champion, with Tours Volley-Ball
 2004 France Championship -  Champion, with Tours Volley-Ball
 2004 France Supercup -  Runner-Up, with Tours Volley-Ball
 2004–05 CEV Champions League -   Champion, with Tours Volley-Ball
 2005 France Supercup -  Champion, with Tours Volley-Ball
 2005 France Cup -  Champion, with Tours Volley-Ball
 2006 France Championship -  Runner-Up, with Tours Volley-Ball
 2006 France Supercup -  Runner-Up, with Tours Volley-Ball
 2006 France Cup -  Champion, with Tours Volley-Ball
 2006–07 CEV Champions League -  Runner-Up, with Tours Volley-Ball

References

External links
FIVB Profile

1976 births
Living people
Sportspeople from Constantine, Algeria
Algerian expatriate sportspeople in the United Arab Emirates
Algerian men's volleyball players
21st-century Algerian people